Stefan Domański (18 February 1904 – 23 July 1961) was a Polish footballer. He played in six matches for the Poland national football team from 1924 to 1934.

References

External links
 

1904 births
1961 deaths
Polish footballers
Poland international footballers
Place of birth missing
Association football goalkeepers
KS Warszawianka players